Ewen McGowen Green (born 4 April 1950) is a freelance chess teacher in Auckland, New Zealand.

Green attained FIDE Master status in 1992. In 1979–80 he won the New Zealand Chess Championship along with Vernon A. Small and Ortvin Sarapu and has also been an Olympiad player (1970, 1974, 1976).

In 2013, he was equal second in New Zealand Chess Championship.

He is regarded as one of New Zealand's best chess coaches; he coached Cliff Curtis and other cast members of the New Zealand film The Dark Horse.

Green holds the Oceania record for simultaneous games of blindfold chess of 17 boards (13 wins, 1 draw, 3 losses) in an arbitered demonstration.

Notable game

Murray Chandler describes this as "one of the most brilliant combinations ever played by a New Zealander".1...Rxe7! 2.Qxe7 Qxf3!! 3.gxf3 Rg8+ 4.Kf1 Ba6+ 5.Re2 Nd2+ 6.Ke1 Nxf3+ 7.Kd1 Rg1+ 0-1

References

External links
 
 
 

1950 births
Living people
New Zealand chess players
Chess FIDE Masters
Chess Olympiad competitors